Violeta de Outono (Portuguese for "Autumn Violet") is the debut album from the eponymous Brazilian psychedelic rock band Violeta de Outono, released on July 7, 1987 by RCA Records. It was re-released in 2007 by Voiceprint Records, containing four bonus tracks.

A music video for the track "Dia Eterno" was made; it was shot in 1987 at the National Observatory, in Rio de Janeiro. It is Violeta de Outono's only music video so far.

Track listing

Personnel
 Fabio Golfetti – vocals, guitar
 Cláudio Souza – drums
 Angelo Pastorello – bass, cover art
 Reinaldo B. Brito – production
 Pedro Fontanari Filho, Stelio Carlini, Walter Lima, Claudio Coev – engineering

References

External links
 Violeta de Outono at Violeta de Outono's official Bandcamp

1987 debut albums
Violeta de Outono albums
Portuguese-language albums